MindGamers is a 2015 Austrian science fiction film directed by Andrew Goth. The film was theatrically released on March 28, 2017 through Terra Mater Factual Studios. The film stars Tom Payne, Dominique Tipper, Sam Neill, Melia Kreiling, Antonia Campbell-Hughes, Turlough Convery and Oliver Stark.

Plot
A group of students attempt to create a wireless neural network of collective consciousness connected through a quantum computer. They discover that motor skills can be transferred through quantum theory and freely spread their technology, which they believe is a step towards intellectual freedom. The group later discovers they are a part of a larger, more sinister experiment.

Cast
Tom Payne as Jaxon
Dominique Tipper as Maddie
Sam Neill as Kreutz
Melia Kreiling as En.o.ch
Antonia Campbell-Hughes as Agnes
Turlough Convery as Rollo
Oliver Stark as Dylan
Ryan Doyle as Voltaire
Simon Paisley-Day as Assessor
Pedja Bjelac as Mosca
Ursula Strauss as Da'Silva

Marketing
In October 2016, Terra Mater Factual Studios, a production unit of Red Bull Media House, globally released an online escape room game Mission: Unlock Enoch based on the film. In January 2017, Forbes reported that one thousand movie goers would be able to participate in a live experiment during the release of the film by wearing a cognitive headband to "enable scientists to capture the cognition state of the participants simultaneously via cloud technology and collect data in real time."

Release
The film was released theatrically on March 28, 2017 through Terra Mater Films and Fathom Events.

References

External links
 
 
 

2015 films
2010s science fiction thriller films
American science fiction thriller films
2010s English-language films
2010s American films